Kozacha Lopan is an urban-type settlement in Kharkiv Raion of Kharkiv Oblast in Ukraine. Kozacha Lopan belongs to Derhachi urban hromada, one of the hromadas of Ukraine. Population:

History
Until 18 July 2020, Kozacha Lopan belonged to Derhachi Raion. The raion was abolished in July 2020 as part of the administrative reform of Ukraine, which reduced the number of raions of Kharkiv Oblast to seven. The area of Derhachi Raion was merged into Kharkiv Raion.

2022 Russian occupation 

In March 2022, after the start of the Russian invasion of Ukraine, the settlement was occupied by the Russian Army. As part of the invasion, Russian forces shelled residential areas in Kozacha Lopan. By May, there were unconfirmed reports that Ukrainian forces were engaged in combat near to the settlement. By 11 September 2022, the Russian army has left Kozacha Lopan, prompting the locals to raise the Ukrainian flag once again.

Economy

Transportation
Kozacha Lopan railway station is on the railway connecting Kharkiv and Belgorod. There is local passenger traffic in the direction of Kharkiv, and long-distance trains connecting Kharkiv with Russia. Kozacha Lopan is the last station on the Ukrainian side, and here border and custom controls take place.

The settlement has road access to Highway M20 which connects Kharkiv with the Russian border and continues across the border to Belgorod.

References

Urban-type settlements in Kharkiv Raion
Kharkovsky Uyezd